State Route 181 (SR 181) is a highway in Cochise County, Arizona that runs from its junction with US 191 east of Pearce to the Chiricahua National Monument.  It is an east–west route for the half east of Pearce, but becomes a primarily north–south route on the half approaching the monument.

SR 181 serves primarily as an access to the monument, although it also services the settlement of Sunizona east of Pearce.

Route description

The western terminus is located at US 191 east of Pearce.  The highway heads east from this intersection through Sunizona where the highway briefly heads towards the south before curving back towards the east.  It continues towards the east until it turns towards the north at an intersection with Turkey Creek and Kuykendall Cutoff roads.  The highway continues heading towards the north with the occasional curve towards the northeast before continuing north.  When SR 181 reaches an intersection with SR 186, SR 181 turns towards the east.  It continues towards the east until it reaches its eastern terminus at the Chiricahua National Monument boundary.

History 
The route was established by the Arizona Department of Transportation between 1935 and 1938 with its current routing from SR 81 (now US 191) to the Chiricahua National Monument. Since then, the routing has not been changed and SR 181 remains as when it was defined.

Junction list

References

181
Transportation in Cochise County, Arizona